Nasrabad Rural District is a rural district (dehestan) in the Central District of Qasr-e Shirin County, Kermanshah Province, Iran. At the 2006 census, its population was 1,899, in 489 families. The rural district has 14 villages.

References 

Rural Districts of Kermanshah Province
Qasr-e Shirin County